Nyenga is a settlement in Kenya's Nyanza Province.

Location
The settlement lies in extreme southwestern Kenya, close to the eastern shores of Lake Victoria.

References

Populated places in Nyanza Province